Grager or gragger is a Purim noisemaking device.

Gragger may also refer to:
Anton Fritz Gragger (born c. 1920s), Austrian chess player
 (1887–1926),  literary historian, university teacher and philologist of Hungarian descent

See also